Luis Mario Díaz Espinoza (born 6 December 1998) is a Costa Rican professional footballer who plays as a winger for Major League Soccer club Columbus Crew and the Costa Rica national team.

Career
Díaz started his career in the academy of his local team, AD Guanacasteca at the age of five, remaining with the academy until he was seventeen. In 2016, he attended a tournament with Guanacasteca in which he was noticed by Municipal Grecia, where he was subsequently signed. In the 2016–17 season, he and Grecia earned promotion to Liga FPD, the first division of Costa Rican football. Over the summer of 2018, Díaz was the subject of transfer rumors from Herediano; he would officially join Herediano for the 2019 Clausura. On July 2, 2019, it was announced that Díaz had been transferred to Major League Soccer club Columbus Crew SC for $1 million, and would join the club as a Young Designated Player.

Díaz made his Columbus debut on July 17 against the Chicago Fire. Coming on in the 65th minute for Eduardo Sosa, Diaz assisted fellow debutant Romario Williams in scoring a 90th-minute equalizer as part of a 2–2 draw. He went on to finish the 2019 season making 13 appearances along with two goals and four assists. During the 2020 season, Diaz was part of the Columbus team that won the 2020 MLS Cup, making a total of 25 appearances for the club. Though Diaz was in and out of the starting lineup throughout the season, he started three out of four of the club's playoff games, including the final in which Columbus beat the Seattle Sounders 3–0.

International
He made his Costa Rica national team debut on 6 September 2019 in a friendly against Uruguay, when he replaced Joel Campbell in the 68th minute and was cautioned in the remaining minutes.

Career statistics

Club

International

Honours 
Columbus Crew
 MLS Cup: 2020
 Campeones Cup: 2021

References

External links
 
 

Living people
1998 births
Costa Rican men's footballers
People from Guanacaste Province
Association football midfielders
Municipal Grecia players
C.S. Herediano footballers
Columbus Crew players
Liga FPD players
Major League Soccer players
Costa Rica under-20 international footballers
Costa Rica international footballers
Designated Players (MLS)
Costa Rican expatriate footballers
Expatriate soccer players in the United States
Costa Rican expatriate sportspeople in the United States